or  is a lake in Deatnu-Tana Municipality in Troms og Finnmark county, Norway.

See also
List of lakes in Norway

References

Tana, Norway
Lakes of Troms og Finnmark